Percy Harper Hatfield  (born ) is a politician in Ontario, Canada. He is a New Democratic member of the Legislative Assembly of Ontario who was elected in a 2013 by-election. He represents the riding of Windsor—Tecumseh.

Early life and education
Hatfield was born in St. Martins, New Brunswick. As an army brat he frequently moved, living in Fort Churchill, Manitoba, Halifax, Nova Scotia, Oromocto, New Brunswick, St. John's, Newfoundland, Port Alberni, British Columbia, and Pembroke, Ontario. He holds a bachelor's degree in political science from the University of Windsor.

Career

In Pembroke Hatfield started a broadcast career at CHOV radio and television in 1970. He then worked in radio and television in St. John's, Newfoundland and Leamington, Ontario.

He worked as a weekend reporter with the Windsor Star before joining CBC radio in Windsor as a local reporter. In 1978, he transferred to CBC television in Windsor. For the most part of his career he has been a reporter, although he also spent time as an announcer, writer, and producer. Hatfield was part of the Windsor Experiment which introduced multi-skilling and cross-skilling to CBC operations. Reporters started shooting their own television stories, and camera operators were trained as reporters - becoming video journalists.

Although he covered the education and automotive beats, most of his time with CBC Television was spent as Windsor's Municipal Affairs Reporter. For many years he hosted a popular segment called “Percy’s Political Panel” where many up and coming would-be politicians got their first notice in the public eye. Some went on to get elected at the municipal, provincial and federal levels.

°Hatfield  was heavily involved with his union while working at the CBC. Initially, it was the old Canadian Wire Service Guild, the CWSG, where besides serving as a local shop steward he served ten years on his National Executive. The CWSG was a Local of The Newspaper Guild (TNG), based in Washington, D.C. Hatfield was elected as the national Secretary of the CWSG and the Chair of the Canadian District Council of the Newspaper Guild.  The CWSG evolved into the Canadian Media Guild and he was elected Vice-President for Central Canada then elected At-Large as a member of the International Executive Board (the I.E.B.) of the Newspaper Guild, the first Canadian ever elected to an “at large” position with the Guild.       

Soon after, TNG merged with and became a Sector within the Communications Workers of America (CWA) based in Washington, D.C.. After three terms as an “At Large” member, the I.E.B. was downsized, dropping the “At Large” positions  and Hatfield went on to serve two terms as the Easter Canadian Vice-President of the TNG/CWA. In 2000, he was recognized by his Union with the CMG's Meritorious Service Award.

Politics
When he retired from the CBC in August 2006 he began getting involved in municipal politics. That fall he was elected to the first of two terms as a City Councillor in Windsor.

As a Councillor Hatfield served two terms on the National Board of the Federation of Canadian Municipalities (FCM) and was elected three times to the board of the Association of Municipalities of Ontario (AMO). In 2011, Hatfield served as an AMO Chair of the Large Urban Caucus. He has served on numerous City of Windsor and Agency committees including the AMO Host Committee, Arena Board, Armouries Reuse Committee, CAO Performance Review Committee, Clean City Committee, Council Support Services Review Committee, Development Charges Task Force, Environmental Master Plan Implementation Committee, Essex Region Conservation Authority, Heritage Committee, International Relations Committee, Museum Facility Steering Committee, Olde Riverside BIA, Planning & Economic Development Standing Committee, Planning Advisory Committee, Public Health Unit, Roseland Golf Club Board of Directors, Social Development Standing Committee, Solid Waste Authority, Tourism Windsor - Transitional Board, Transit Windsor Board of Directors, War Memorial Committee, WFCU Steering Committee, Windsor BIA Advisory Committee, Windsor Essex Community Housing Corporation Board, Windsor Essex County Health Unit, Windsor Essex Environment Committee, Windsor Licensing Commission, and the Windsor Public Library Board.

Hatfield was elected to the Legislative Assembly of Ontario in a by-election on August 1, 2013, as the New Democratic candidate in the riding of Windsor—Tecumseh. He defeated Progressive Conservative candidate Robert De Verteuil by 10,544 votes. He was re-elected in the 2014 provincial election defeating Liberal Jason Dupuis by 17,221 votes. Hatfield was re-elected in the 2018 provincial election, defeating Progressive Conservative candidate Mohammad Latif by 13,546 votes.

His previous critic roles include Infrastructure, Environment and Climate Change, and Municipal Affairs and Housing. Currently, Hatfield holds the critic role of OLG and Horse Racing, as well as the position of Second Deputy Speaker of the Committee of the Whole House. In this position, Hatfield was asked by Speaker Ted Arnott to be Ontario's representative on the Executive Committee of the Council of State Governments (CSG). The CSG is a region-based forum that fosters the exchange of insights and ideas to help state and provincial officials shape public policy. Hatfield's appointment was the first time that the Legislative Assembly of Ontario was offered a seat on the CSG Executive Committee.

He was also appointed by Speaker Arnott to serve as a member of the Midwest-Canada Relations Committee for the Midwestern Legislative Conference. This committee provides a forum for the exchange of ideas and consideration of mutual concerns, and has explored subjects ranging from border security, energy, and most recently trade-related issues and the future of Canada – US relations.

In December 2017, he introduced the bill Poet Laureate of Ontario Act In Memory of Gord Downie to the Legislative Assembly of Ontario; it passed in December 2019, establishing the Poet Laureate of Ontario.

In July 2021, Hatfield announced that he would be retiring from politics in 2022.

Electoral record

Personal life
Hatfield married Gale Simko in 1975, and they have two children and six grandchildren.

References

External links
 

1948 births
CBC Television people
Canadian radio reporters and correspondents
Canadian television reporters and correspondents
Living people
Ontario New Democratic Party MPPs
People from Saint John County, New Brunswick
University of Windsor alumni
Windsor, Ontario city councillors
21st-century Canadian politicians